The 1993–94 season was the 46th season in Vardar’s history and their second in the Macedonian First League. Their 1st place finish in the 1992–93 season meant it was their 2nd successive season playing in the First League.

In that season Vardar was won the championship for the second consecutive time and qualified for the 1994–95 UEFA Cup.

Competitions

Overall

First League

Classification

Results by round

Matches

Source: Google Groups

Macedonian Football Cup

Source: Google Groups

References

FK Vardar seasons
Vardar